Antonio Zara (died 13 December 1621) was a Roman Catholic prelate who served as Bishop of Pedena (1601–1621).

Biography
On 13 May 1601, Antonio Zara was appointed during the papacy of Pope Clement VIII as Bishop of Pedena. He served as Bishop of Pedena until his death on 13 December 1621.

References 

17th-century Roman Catholic bishops in Croatia
Bishops appointed by Pope Clement VIII
1621 deaths